The broad-headed serotine (Nycticeinops crassulus), formerly known as the broad-headed pipistrelle, is a species of vesper bat in the family Vespertilionidae. It is found in Angola, Cameroon, Republic of the Congo, Democratic Republic of the Congo, Ivory Coast, Guinea, liberia, Kenya, South Sudan, and Uganda. Its natural habitats are subtropical and tropical forests.

References

Nycticeinops
Taxonomy articles created by Polbot
Taxa named by Oldfield Thomas
Mammals described in 1904
Bats of Africa
Taxobox binomials not recognized by IUCN